Gabriel-Marie-Joseph-Anselme de Broglie-Revel (born 21 April 1931) is a French historian and politician.

Broglie-Revel was elected to the Académie française in 2001, replacing Alain Peyrefitte. He is a Knight Commander of the Légion d'honneur. He is a distant relative of the ducs de Broglie.

Bibliography
 1972  Le Général de Valence, ou L'Insouciance et la gloire  (Perrin)
 1974  Le Conseil d'État. Ouvrage collectif  (Éd. du C.N.R.S.)
 1977  Ségur sans cérémonie, ou La gaîté libertine  (Perrin)
 1979  Histoire politique de la Revue des deux mondes de 1829 à 1979  (Perrin)
 1981  L'Orléanisme ou La ressource libérale de la France  (Perrin)
 1982  Une image vaut dix mille mots. Essai sur la télévision  (Plon)
 1985  Madame de Genlis  (Perrin)
 1987  Le Français pour qu'il vive  (Gallimard)
 1990  Guizot  (Perrin)
 1991  La Vraie Madame Gervaisais. Introduction et présentation  (Société des Bibliophiles françois)
 1995  XIXe siècle, l'éclat et le déclin de la France  (Perrin)
 2000  Mac-Mahon  (Perrin)
 2001  Le Droit d'auteur et l'Internet  (PUF)

External links
  L'Académie française
  Les Immortels: Gabriel de BROGLIE

1931 births
Living people
Knights of the Ordre national du Mérite
Sciences Po alumni
École nationale d'administration alumni
Members of the Conseil d'État (France)
20th-century French historians
French untitled nobility
Grand Officiers of the Légion d'honneur
Gabriel
Members of the Académie des sciences morales et politiques
Members of the Académie Française
French male non-fiction writers
Writers from Versailles